The Wizarding World of Harry Potter is a chain of themed areas at Universal Destinations & Experiences based on the Harry Potter media franchise, adapting elements from the Warner Bros.' film series and original novels by J. K. Rowling. The areas were designed by Universal Creative from an exclusive license with Warner Bros. Entertainment.

Background
A Harry Potter-themed attraction at either a Disney or Universal park was rumored in 2003. However, the rights to the Harry Potter franchise had been acquired by Warner Bros., who denied all rumors. Both Disney and Universal entered bidding negotiations with Warner Bros. and Rowling for the theme park rights to Harry Potter. In 2004, Rowling signed a letter-of-intent with Disney, with the company intending to develop a Harry Potter section within an area of Fantasyland at the Magic Kingdom park at Walt Disney World. In January 2007, About.com reported a rumor from a "highly credible source" that the Islands of Adventure park's Lost Continent area was going to be re-themed "to the stories and characters of one of the most popular children's franchises". Other sources followed up in the next few days with unofficial confirmation that the new area would involve Harry Potter. On May 31, 2007, Universal, in partnership with Warner Bros., officially announced the Wizarding World of Harry Potter would be added to Islands of Adventure.

Parks

Universal Orlando Resort

Both theme parks at the Universal Orlando Resort in Orlando, FloridaIslands Of Adventure and Universal Studios Floridahave Wizarding World of Harry Potter themed environments. Both parks include Hogwarts Express stations allowing passengers to reach both theme parks aboard the full-scale replica of the train that appears in the film series.

At the Universal's Islands of Adventure theme park, the Wizarding World of Harry Potter opened on June 18, 2010. It includes re-creation of Hogsmeade and three rides. The flagship attraction is Harry Potter and the Forbidden Journey, which exists within a re-creation of Hogwarts School of Witchcraft and Wizardry. A new roller coaster, Hagrid's Magical Creatures Motorbike Adventure, which replaced the Dragon Challenge, opened on June 13, 2019. Other rides include Flight of the Hippogriff, a family roller coaster, and the Hogwarts Express. Other attractions include Ollivanders Wand Shop, the Triwizard Spirit Rally, and the Frog Choir. Hogsmeade contains many gift shops and restaurants from the book series including Dervish and Banges, Honeydukes, Ollivanders, the Three Broomsticks, and the Hog's Head.

At the Universal Studios Florida theme park, another Wizarding World of Harry Potter land opened on July 8, 2014. It includes a re-creation of Diagon Alley and connecting alleys, as well as a small section of Muggle London. It includes the rides Harry Potter and the Escape from Gringotts and the Hogwarts Express. Other attractions include Ollivanders Wand Shop, a puppet performance of The Tales of Beedle the Bard, and a live performance by Celestina Warbeck and the Banshees. The area also contains many shops and restaurants from the book series including The Leaky Cauldron, Ollivanders Wand Shop, Weasleys' Wizard Wheezes, Borgin and Burkes, Madam Malkin's Robes for All Occasions, Wiseacre's Wizarding Equipment and Florean Fortescue's Ice Cream Parlour.

Universal Studios Japan

At the Universal Studios Japan theme park in Osaka, Japan, the Wizarding World of Harry Potter opened on July 15, 2014. It includes the village of Hogsmeade, Harry Potter and the Forbidden Journey ride, and Flight of the Hippogriff roller coaster. Two features in the Japanese park not found in Orlando or Hollywood are Hogwarts' Black Lake and live owls.

Universal Studios Hollywood

The Wizarding World of Harry Potter opened at Universal Studios Hollywood on April 7, 2016, Replacing The Adventures of Curious George which closed on September 6, 2013. The flagship attraction is the flight-simulating ride Harry Potter and the Forbidden Journey, similar to the Orlando one. Visitors once wore Quidditch-inspired 3D goggles throughout the ride for an enhanced ride experience, but the 3D visuals have recently been replaced by 2D.

Universal Studios Beijing

Attractions
The table below shows the different attractions across all the parks around the world.

See also 
Places in Harry Potter

References

External links
 The Wizarding World of Harry Potter

Harry Potter in amusement parks
Licensed properties at Universal Parks & Resorts
Universal Parks & Resorts attractions by name
2010 establishments in Florida